On 13 November 1975, a bomb exploded outside an ice cream parlor in Jerusalem, Israel.

The bomb had been placed in a baggage cart by Arab militants and exploded outside an ice cream shop in Zion Square on Jaffa Road at around 7:00 PM. Many Storefronts were damaged. Six teenagers were killed, including three boys and three girls. 42 people were injured, including two tourists from the United States and Netherlands, all of which were treated at the Shaare Zedek Medical Center.

Two Lebanon-based Palestinian groups, Fatah and the Democratic Front for the Liberation of Palestine claimed responsibility for the attack, which happened three days after United Nations General Assembly Resolution 3379 was passed, and on the anniversary of Yasser Arafat's speech to the United Nations. According to historian Richard J. Chasdi the attack was perpetrated by Fatah and was intentionally meant to coincide with the speech's anniversary. Wafa described the bombing as "a heroic and daring operation"  which had caused "[a] large number of casualties among the settlers... according to preliminary estimates 20 were killed and 50 wounded, most seriously."

See also 

 Zion Square refrigerator bombing - which occurred on 4 July 1975.

References 

Terrorist incidents in Israel in the 1970s
Zion Square
Terrorist incidents in Jerusalem
20th-century mass murder in Israel
Terrorist incidents in Asia in 1975
1975 crimes in Israel
1975 murders in Asia
November 1975 crimes
November 1975 events in Asia
Murdered Israeli children
Improvised explosive device bombings in 1975
Mass murder in 1975
Palestinian terrorism